The Bangladeshi decimal fifty-poysha coin was first minted in 1973. It is a small denomination of Bangladeshi monetary unit which is the taka. It equals one half of a taka.

References

Currencies of Bangladesh